

382001–382100 

|-bgcolor=#f2f2f2
| colspan=4 align=center | 
|}

382101–382200 

|-bgcolor=#f2f2f2
| colspan=4 align=center | 
|}

382201–382300 

|-id=238
| 382238 Euphemus ||  || Euphemus, son of Troezenus, was a leader of the Thracian Cicones, and an ally of the Trojans. || 
|}

382301–382400 

|-bgcolor=#f2f2f2
| colspan=4 align=center | 
|}

382401–382500 

|-bgcolor=#f2f2f2
| colspan=4 align=center | 
|}

382501–382600 

|-bgcolor=#f2f2f2
| colspan=4 align=center | 
|}

382601–382700 

|-bgcolor=#f2f2f2
| colspan=4 align=center | 
|}

382701–382800 

|-bgcolor=#f2f2f2
| colspan=4 align=center | 
|}

382801–382900 

|-id=900
| 382900 Rendelmann ||  || Holger Rendelmann (born 1955), a German amateur astronomer and astrophotographer, who was an early promotor of CCD digital imaging in Germany and observer of variable stars. || 
|}

382901–383000 

|-bgcolor=#f2f2f2
| colspan=4 align=center | 
|}

References 

382001-383000